Evorinea hirtella, is a species of skin beetle found in India, Malaysia, Nepal, and Sri Lanka.

It is a minor pest on cinnamon.

References 

Dermestidae
Insects of Sri Lanka
Insects described in 1858